São Paulo Madrid was a professional football club from Madrid, Spain.  The club was founded as Santangelo C.A., but due to a partnership with São Paulo of Brazil, on March 8, 2003, the club played their first game with the Brazilian football club jerseys against U.D. Hortaleza at El Pardo.  The match ended in a 3-1 victory to the opposition. By then, Santangelo had 10 years and 2 titles under their belt. On July 1, 2003, the club was officially renamed to its current name, São Paulo Madrid. The club folded on June 30, 2008.

References 

Defunct football clubs in the Community of Madrid
Association football clubs established in 1993
Association football clubs disestablished in 2008
São Paulo FC
1993 establishments in Spain
2008 disestablishments in Spain